Patrick Johansson (born 24 September 1963) is a Swedish bandy coach and former player. Johansson played most of his career for Vetlanda BK

Johansson was part of the 1987 and 1993 Bandy World Championship winning squads.

Career

Club career
Johansson has represented Vetlanda, Selånger, Nässjö, Målilla

International career
Johansson was part of Swedish World Champions teams of 1987 and 1993

Honours

Country 
 Sweden
 Bandy World Championship: 1987, 1993

References

External links
 

1963 births
Living people
Swedish bandy players
Swedish bandy managers
Vetlanda BK players
Selånger SK Bandy players
Nässjö IF players
Sweden international bandy players
Bandy World Championship-winning players